Concord Township is one of twenty-five townships in Bureau County, Illinois, USA. As of the 2020 census, its population was 1,423 and it contained 738 housing units.

Geography

Cities
 Buda
 Sheffield (east three-quarters)

Unincorporated towns
 Bourbonais (historical)
 Langley

Cemeteries
The township contains four cemeteries:
 Fifield
 Hopeland
 Saint Patrick
 Sheffield

Major highways
  Interstate 80
  US Route 6
  Illinois Route 88

Landmarks
 Hennepin Canal Parkway State Park
 Hidden Lake Country Club

Demographics
As of the 2020 census there were 1,423 people, 647 households, and 430 families residing in the township. The racial makeup of the township was 94.94% White, 0.14% African American, 0.07% Native American, 0.35% Asian, 0.00% Pacific Islander, 0.91% from other races, and 3.58% from two or more races. Hispanic or Latino of any race were 2.39% of the population.

There were 647 households, out of which 28.40% had children under the age of 18 living with them, 51.31% were married couples living together, 8.96% had a female householder with no spouse present, and 33.54% were non-families. 24.00% of all households were made up of individuals, and 9.60% had someone living alone who was 65 years of age or older. The average household size was 2.42 and the average family size was 2.80.

The township's age distribution consisted of 22.5% under the age of 18, 6.2% from 18 to 24, 23.7% from 25 to 44, 29.7% from 45 to 64, and 17.9% who were 65 years of age or older. The median age was 42.9 years. For every 100 females, there were 92.6 males. For every 100 females age 18 and over, there were 97.7 males.

The median income for a household in the township was $49,338, and the median income for a family was $66,364. Males had a median income of $45,865 versus $27,917 for females. The per capita income for the township was $25,621. About 7.9% of families and 11.3% of the population were below the poverty line, including 5.1% of those under age 18 and 7.9% of those age 65 or over.

School districts
 Bureau Valley Community Unit School District 340

Political districts
 Illinois's 11th congressional district
 State House District 74
 State Senate District 37

References
 
 US Census Bureau 2007 TIGER/Line Shapefiles
 United States National Atlas

External links
 City-Data.com
 Illinois State Archives

Townships in Bureau County, Illinois
Populated places established in 1849
Townships in Illinois
1849 establishments in Illinois